Spruce Pine is a town in Mitchell County, North Carolina, United States. The population was 2,175 at the 2010 census.

History
Spruce Pine was founded in 1907 when the Clinchfield Railroad made its way up the North Toe River from Erwin, Tennessee. The town was originally centered around a tavern operated by Isaac English, located on an old roadway that ran from Cranberry, North Carolina, down to Marion, NC. The Old English Inn still stands at its original location near the center of town. In 1923, after an escaped convict allegedly raped a local resident, a large armed mob rounded up scores of men who were laboring on a road construction project and forced them to leave town on boxcars. North Carolina Governor Cameron Morrison deployed National Guard troops to Spruce Pine so that the workers could return and complete the road.

The railroad, combined with a rapidly expanding mining industry (the town is the namesake of the famous Spruce Pine Mining District) made Spruce Pine the largest town in the Toe River Valley, as it became the hub of commerce and culture for the area. Spruce Pine was the home of The Feldspar Company and Spruce Pine Mica, and other major mining interests had operations in and around the town.

With the decline in use of railroads to ship goods, along with increasing automation in the mining industry, the town has recently seen its fortunes dwindle and has undertaken a major effort to reinvent itself. Tourism has become a major economic force in the region, and the town's proximity to the Blue Ridge Parkway, combined with its location near the edge of the Blue Ridge Escarpment, has helped make Spruce Pine a travel destination for many.  The town also boasts the moniker of "The Mineral City of the World".

In 1998, the medium-security men's state prisons Mountain View Correctional Institution and Avery-Mitchell Correctional Institution opened at the Avery-Mitchell County line.

On August 4, 2007, the downtown area of Spruce Pine was threatened when an arsonist set fire to several buildings downtown. The fires, which brought firemen from four counties around Spruce Pine, severely damaged the building housing Cheapskates Music on Lower Street, and caused some tense moments when it seemed that the fires might spread out of control and consume the downtown area.

The Downtown Spruce Pine Historic District and Gunter Building are listed on the National Register of Historic Places.
Spruce Pine is the exclusive supplier of sand to Augusta National Golf Club.

Geography

According to the United States Census Bureau, the town has a total area of 3.9 square miles (10.1 km2), all  land. The town limits are approximately three miles from the Blue Ridge Parkway, 50 miles northeast of Asheville and 40 miles southwest of Boone.

Climate

Demographics

2020 census

As of the 2020 United States census, there were 2,194 people, 936 households, and 535 families residing in the town.

2000 census
According to the census of 2000, there were 2,030 people, 888 households, and 575 families residing in the town. The population density was 522.0 people per square mile (201.5/km2). There were 968 housing units at an average density of 248.9 per square mile (96.1/km2). The racial makeup of the town was 96.35% White, 0.39% African American, 0.54% Native American, 0.05% Asian, 2.27% from other races, and 0.39% from two or more races. Hispanic or Latino of any race were 3.79% of the population.

There were 888 households, out of which 27.3% had children under the age of 18 living with them, 48.8% were married couples living together, 12.5% had a female householder with no husband present, and 35.2% were non-families. 32.1% of all households were made up of individuals, and 16.8% had someone living alone who was 65 years of age or older. The average household size was 2.29 and the average family size was 2.89.

In the town, the population was spread out, with 23.3% under the age of 18, 8.3% from 18 to 24, 26.6% from 25 to 44, 22.3% from 45 to 64, and 19.7% who were 65 years of age or older. The median age was 40 years. For every 100 females, there were 88.1 males. For every 100 females age 18 and over, there were 84.6 males.

The median income for a household in the town was $24,766, and the median income for a family was $33,902. Males had a median income of $22,324 versus $22,375 for females. The per capita income for the town was $15,440. About 12.4% of families and 17.0% of the population were below the poverty line, including 30.5% of those under age 18 and 10.1% of those age 65 or over.

Landmarks and facilities
East Carolina University Dental School announced a facility would open in 2014 on the Blue Ridge Regional Hospital campus to serve Western North Carolina residents in the Mayland area (Mitchell, Avery and Yancey Counties). This facility is one of 5 facilities proposed throughout the state of North Carolina.

Spruce Pine is home to five schools: Greenlee Primary (K-2), Deyton Elementary (3-5), Harris Middle (6-8), Tri- County Christian School and the Spruce Pine Montessori School (18 months - 6th grade). Secondary education for Spruce Pine students is at Mitchell High School, located in the Ledger community of Mitchell County.

Mayland Community College also calls Spruce Pine home. Founded by an act of the North Carolina General Assembly in 1971, Mayland hosts some 35 curriculum programs and provides vocational and technical training, along with college transfer opportunities to residents of the region.

To the northeast of the town is Smithmore Castle, a hotel with a restaurant headed by Benjamin Epicure.

Media 

Spruce Pine is home to The Mitchell News-Journal, a weekly newspaper printed by Community Newspapers, Inc. and WTOE radio, at 1470 kHz on the AM dial and 101.1 FM. The radio station operates 24 hours a day and is an ABC Radio affiliate. It is owned by Mountain Valley Media, based in Burnsville, NC.

Transport

Beginning in 2014, The North Carolina Department of Transportation began widening U.S. Route 19E, which is the major corridor linking the towns of Spruce Pine and Burnsville to Interstate 26. The widened highway has transformed a two-lane highway to a divided four-lane featuring grassy medians and turn lanes. The widening project was completed in 2020.

Notable people
 Gaylord Perry, Professional Baseball Hall of Fame pitcher was a resident of Spruce Pine.
 Bill Szymczyk, American music producer & technical engineer. Bill has produced such acts as B.B. King, Eagles, Joe Walsh, James Gang & Elvin Bishop just to name a few. He now lives in Little Switzerland a suburb of Spruce Pine.
 Roy Williams, UNC basketball coach, was born in Spruce Pine but grew up in Asheville.
 Gerri Willis, Native of Spruce Pine, Fox Business Network Anchor and Reporter.
 Indigo De Souza, Raised in Spruce Pine, indie-rock musician.

In popular culture
Violet Karl, the protagonist of the musical Violet (based on a short story by North Carolina writer Doris Betts), is from Spruce Pine.

References

External links
 Official website of Spruce Pine, NC
 Events in Spruce Pine
 Spruce Pine Montessori School
 Tri-County Christian School
 

Towns in Mitchell County, North Carolina
Towns in North Carolina
Populated places established in 1907